In mathematics, the constant problem is the problem of deciding whether a given expression is equal to zero.

The problem
This problem is also referred to as the identity problem or the method of zero estimates.  It has no formal statement as such but refers to a general problem prevalent in transcendental number theory.  Often proofs in transcendence theory are proofs by contradiction. Specifically, they use some auxiliary function to create an integer n ≥ 0, which is shown to satisfy n < 1.  Clearly, this means that n must have the value zero, and so a contradiction arises if one can show that in fact n is not zero.

In many transcendence proofs, proving that n ≠ 0 is very difficult, and hence a lot of work has been done to develop methods that can be used to prove the non-vanishing of certain expressions.  The sheer generality of the problem is what makes it difficult to prove general results or come up with general methods for attacking it.  The number n that arises may involve integrals, limits, polynomials, other functions, and determinants of matrices.

Results
In certain cases, algorithms or other methods exist for proving that a given expression is non-zero, or of showing that the problem is undecidable.  For example, if x1, ..., xn are real numbers, then there is an algorithm for deciding whether there are integers a1, ..., an such that

 

If the expression we are interested in contains an oscillating function, such as the sine or cosine function, then it has been shown that the problem is undecidable, a result known as Richardson's theorem.  In general, methods specific to the expression being studied are required to prove that it cannot be zero.

See also
 Integer relation algorithm

References

Analytic number theory
Unsolved problems in mathematics